Puposyrnola is a genus of sea snails, marine gastropod mollusks in the subfamily Turbonillinae of the family Pyramidellidae, the pyrams and their allies.

Description
The subcylindrical, milky white shell has a pupoid shape. The columellar tooth is well-developed (but is missing on P. minuta and P. kaasi).

Species
Species within the genus Puposyrnola include:
 Puposyrnola abstrusa Peñas & Rolán, 2016
 † Puposyrnola acicula (Lamarck, 1804) 
 Puposyrnola basistriata Robba, Di Geronimo, Chaimanee, Negri & Sanfilippo, 2004
 Puposyrnola bonardi Saurin, 1959 
 Puposyrnola callembryon (Dautzenberg & Fischer, 1906) 
 Puposyrnola convoluta (Watson, 1886) 
 Puposyrnola dorothea van Aartsen & Corgan, 1996 
 Puposyrnola eruca Laseron, 1959 
 Puposyrnola fastigiata (Suter, 1906)
 Puposyrnola fuscofasciata Peñas & Rolán, 2016
 Puposyrnola harrissoni (Tate & May, 1900) 
 Puposyrnola fuscofasciata Peñas & Rolán, 2016
 Puposyrnola intrafuniculata Peñas & Rolán, 2016
 Puposyrnola inturbida (Yokoyama, 1927) 
 Puposyrnola kaasi van Aartsen, Gittenberger E. & Goud, 1998
 Puposyrnola micrembryon Saurin, 1959 
 Puposyrnola missile Laws, 1937
 Puposyrnola petterdi Gatliff, 1900 
 Puposyrnola philippinensis Peñas & Rolán, 2016
 Puposyrnola proletare Laseron, 1951
 † Puposyrnola stirps Laws, 1937
 Puposyrnola tasmanica (Tennison Woods, 1877)
 † Puposyrnola tenuispiralis P. A. Maxwell, 1992 
 Puposyrnola terebroides (Kuroda & Kawamoto, 1956)
 Puposyrnola tracta Saurin, 1959 
 Puposyrnola vienae Saurin, 1959 

The following species were brought into synonymy:
 Puposyrnola minuta (H. Adams, 1869):  synonym of Syrnola minuta Adams H., 1869

References

 Robba, E. (2013). Tertiary and Quaternary fossil pyramidelloidean gastropods of Indonesia. Scripta Geologica. 144: 1-191

External links
 To World Register of Marine Species
 Cossmann, M. (1921). Essais de paléoconchologie comparée. Douzième livraison. Paris: [the author. 349 pp., plates A-D, 1-6.]

Pyramidellidae